The killing of Christian Glass occurred on June 11, 2022, in Clear Creek County, Colorado, near the town of Silver Plume, at approximately 12:30 am. Glass, aged 22, was driving alone in a vehicle in the evening of June 10 when the vehicle went off the road.  Unable to get it back on the road, he called 911 for help at approximately 11:20 pm, June 10.   When the police arrived, Glass may have had some form of mental distress, and refused to get out of the vehicle.  When a police officer, with weapon drawn, asked him why not, he replied "Sir, I'm terrified."

The police tried for over an hour to get Glass to leave the vehicle. Eventually, they broke the window of the vehicle, shot bean bags at Glass, and then tased him.  Glass turned towards an officer while holding a small knife, then attempted to stab himself. Glass was then shot at least five times with a handgun by a Clear Creek County sheriff's deputy, Andrew Buen. Glass died at the scene.

911 call
Glass called 911 at approximately 11:20 pm on June 10, 2022.  In his nearly 25 minute call with the 911 operator, Glass said that "My vehicle got stuck in a really bad way. … I need immediate assistance, please", adding "I will not be fine on my own."  He told her that his vehicle was stuck in a trap, that he was coming off of a depression, and he was worried about "skinwalkers".  He said that "If I got out of the car, I might be in danger," and that he loved her being on the line with him while he was frightened.

He also told the 911 operator that he had two knives, a hammer and a rubber mallet in the car, which he had as an amateur geologist.  He said he would throw them out of the car as soon as the police arrived.  He stated "I’m not dangerous. I will keep my hands completely visible. I understand this is a dodgy situation."

When relaying the call information to the police forces, the 911 operator described Glass as "very paranoid" and "not making much sense".  Later on, the officers on the scene can be heard referring to a possible "psych issue".

Police involvement

Attempts to get Glass out of the vehicle
The episode was recorded on police body-cams.  When the police arrived, they directed Glass to get out of the car, with their hands on their guns.  Glass refused, saying that he was "terrified".  He repeated the offer to throw the knives and mallet out of the car, but a Clear County deputy, Andrew Buen, told him not to and directed him to get out of the car. Glass put the keys to the vehicle on the dashboard and kept his hands visible.  He threw a knife to the other side of the car.

For the next 70 minutes, the police tried to get Glass to get out of the vehicle. He said that staying in the vehicle was the only way he could be safe. More police officers arrived, until eventually officers from five different services were present, including police from Georgetown and Idaho Springs, and the Colorado State Patrol.  At one point, an officer threatened to break the window of the car. Glass was seen praying with folded hands, saying "Dear Lord, please, don't let them break the window." After close to an hour, Glass was seen making a "heart" symbol with his hands towards the officer, and blowing kisses.  A female voice was heard saying "Same back at you, but come on out and talk to us."

At some point, there was a conversation between the county police officers and officers of the Colorado State Patrol who had arrived on the scene. The Patrol officer asked them what "their plan is", adding "if he’s committed no crime and is not suicidal, homicidal, or a great danger, then there is no reason to contact him."  The officers on the scene continued to try to get Glass out of his vehicle.

Police kill Glass
After approximately 70 minutes, an officer states that they will break into Glass's vehicle, saying:  "It’s time to move the night on — OK. We got to move." Buen smashed the front window of the car. Another officer stood on the hood of the vehicle, shining a flashlight on Glass. The officers are heard telling Glass to drop the knife.  They then shot him with bean-bags and he began to flail about in the vehicle.  An officer is heard saying "Someone tase his ass. Someone tase him!"

Buen then shot Glass with a stun gun.  Glass began shouting hysterically, "Lord hear me.  Lord hear me".  An officer is heard saying:  "You can save yourself. You can still save yourself." Glass turned to an officer with a small knife in his hand, then appeared to stab himself before dropping the knife. The body-cam footage does not show Glass ever moving from the driver seat of the vehicle.

Deputy Buen then shot Glass with a handgun at least five times.  The officers dragged Glass's body out of the vehicle; he died on the scene.

Police issue statement
On June 11, 2022, the Clear Creek County sheriff's department issued a statement that the motorist was "argumentative and uncooperative" and had armed himself with a knife.  It stated that the officers tried for over an hour to reach a peaceful resolution, before the deputies broke out the windows and removed a knife.  Referring to Glass as "the suspect", it said that he re-armed himself with another knife and a rock.  It said that the deputies used a bean-bag and taser, and then shot Glass when he tried to stab an officer.

Family reaction
Glass was born and partially educated in New Zealand, but also held American citizenship, as his parents moved to the United States when he was a child.  His parents have explained that he was a geology enthusiast.

On September 13, 2022, Glass's parents held a press conference.  They referred to the killing as "a murder by a Colorado official", and are calling for charges to be laid against the police officers who were responsible.

His father, Simon Glass, stated that the press release issued by the sheriff's department after the killing was "false in almost every respect."  He said that they only learnt how much the police had left out when the police released the body-cam videos to their lawyers. He also said:  "It was dark and he was really worried. He trusted the police to come and help him. Instead, they attacked and killed him." Simon Glass also said: "The killer shot Christian five times, just to make sure. I’ve lost countless hours of sleep to the nightmares, it makes me sick."

His mother, Sally Glass, stated that it was the police who had caused the situation:  "It’s the fact that seven police officers were pointing guns at him. I don’t think I would’ve gotten him out of the car."  She mentioned that her son was taking prescription medications for ADHD.  She also stated that Deputy Buen was back on duty by June 13, still armed.  Undersheriff Bruce Snelling confirmed on September 15 that Deputy Buen was back to work."

Coroner's autopsy and homicide finding
An autopsy was performed.  The  following injuries were found:
six gunshot wounds to Glass's torso and upper right arm, with no evidence of close range fire;
superficial sharp force injuries to the neck, torso and extremities;
blunt force injuries to the head, torso and extremities;
puncture sites to the torso, which matched an electroshock weapon barb recovered from the body bag.

The autopsy also found Glass's blood alcohol level was 0.010, along with some THC and amphetamines in his system.

The coroner found that the cause of death was multiple gunshot wounds, and his manner of death was homicide.

Dr. Andrew Monte, an emergency room physician and medical toxicologist who teaches at the University of Colorado School of Medicine, said that the amount of THC indicated that Glass had used marijuana shortly before his death.  The amount of amphetamine was consistent with a prescription for ADHD.

Subsequent events
The Colorado Bureau of Investigation is reviewing the matter, as is the district attorney for Clear Creek County, Heidi McCollum.  She has stated that her office is required to issue a report, or refer the matter to a grand jury.  McCollum stated that she has been in communication with the United States Attorney’s Office for Colorado, the Justice Department’s Civil Rights Division and the FBI Denver Division about the case.  A spokesperson for the U.S. Attorney's Office stated that they would monitor the matter, and if a violation of federal law appeared to have occurred, they would take the appropriate action.

The lawyer for the Glass family, Siddhartha​ Rathod, has stated that he will begin a civil action shortly.  Rathod said that Glass had no history of serious mental illness, but sometimes had depression.  He had ADHD, for which he was prescribed a Ritalin-like medication.  Rathod alleges that the officer sent to investigate Glass's death intentionally muted his body-cam.

On September 15, 2022, Clear Creek County Undersheriff Bruce Snelling said that the reason Deputy Buen used deadly force on Glass was because he thought Glass was going to stab another officer through a broken window, after he had been tased twice by two different officers and was thrashing back and forth.

Also on September 15, Governor Jared Polis met privately with Sally and Simon Glass to express his condolences.  Afterwards, he issued a statement:  "The unspeakable loss and grief Sally and Simon Glass are living is the worst nightmare of every parent.  This tragedy should never have happened. Colorado mourns for the loss of Christian Glass’s life.

In response to media requests, the Clear Creek County Sheriff's Office has stated that there have been no disciplinary records relating to Deputy Buen, and there have not been any complaints filed against him.  However, one individual, Manuel Camacho, has come forward who filed a complaint against Buen, alleging that while Camacho was in custody in 2019, Buen and other deputies used excessive force on him.  Camacho alleges that Buen placed him in a headlock and kneeled on him, cutting off his air supply, and that he could not breathe.  Camacho states that he filed a complaint, and has followed up with a court action, which has not yet come to trial.

On Wednesday, November 23, deputies Buen and Gould were indicted on several charges and fired.

References 

2022 controversies in the United States
June 2022 events in the United States
Killings by law enforcement officers in the United States
People shot dead by law enforcement officers in the United States
Filmed killings by law enforcement
Deaths by firearm in Colorado
Law enforcement controversies in the United States